The European Masters Indoor Athletics Championships is a biennial international athletics competition for masters athletes aged 35 and over, organised by European Masters Athletics. Formerly known as the European Veterans Indoor Championships, it was first held in 1997.

Editions

References

 
Masters athletics (track and field) competitions
Recurring sporting events established in 1997
Biennial athletics competitions
Athletics competitions in Europe
Indoor track and field competitions
1997 establishments in Europe